U.S. Route 27 (US 27) is a  U.S. Highway in the U.S. state of Georgia. It travels south-to-north through the western part of the state near the Alabama state line. The whole route is Governor's Road Improvement Program (GRIP) corridor EDS-27, providing the bulk of the Tallahassee, Florida–Chattanooga, Tennessee corridor. All of US 27 in Georgia runs concurrently with State Route 1 (SR 1) and is also designated as the Martha Berry Highway. It connects Bainbridge, Colquitt, Blakely, Cuthbert, Lumpkin, Cusseta, Columbus, LaGrange, Carrollton, Bremen, Cedartown, Rome, Summerville, LaFayette, Fort Oglethorpe, and Rossville.

Route description
US 27 starts at the Florida state line, where Decatur and Grady counties meet, and where US 27 continues south into Florida. US 27 heads northwest through rural southwestern Georgia, crossing into Decatur County as a four-lane divided highway, and passes Attapulgus to the east on its way to Bainbridge. South of Bainbridge, US 27 meets with and travels concurrent with US 84/SR 38, and forms a controlled-access perimeter highway around the southern and western portion of the city, before splitting to the northwest into Miller County and through Colquitt into Early County and Blakely.

Now heading north, the highway travels through Bluffton in Clay County, then reaches Cuthbert in Randolph County, again passing the town to its east. US 27 reaches Lumpkin in Stewart County as its next destination. Still heading north, the highway reaches Cusseta in Chattahoochee County, where it travels concurrently with US 280 and SR 520 into Columbus in Muscogee County. The highways head northwest into Columbus and cross I-185. Then, US 27 splits from US 280/SR 520 just before reaching the Alabama state line, and heads north through downtown Columbus, crossing I-185 once again, just before also crossing US 80/SR 22/SR 540 on its way into Harris County.

US 27 roughly parallels I-185 on its trek north through Harris County, and crosses I-185 once more shortly after crossing into Troup County, where it also crosses I-85 just south of LaGrange. The highway continues north, traveling through Heard County, and heads through the heart of Carrollton in Carroll County. Angling northwest, the highway crosses I-20 south of Bremen, and makes its way in a northerly direction through Haralson County into Polk County, where it travels through the eastern part of Cedartown. Entering Floyd County, US 27 briefly becomes a controlled-access highway with exits serving Darlington Drive/Old Lindale Road, Dean Avenue (SR-101), and East 12th Street. Continuing through Rome as Turner McCall Blvd. and Martha Berry Blvd., the highway then angles west toward Chattooga County and Summerville. Turning sharply north again in Summerville, the highway travels through LaFayette in Walker County. At this point, US 27 becomes LaFayette Road and then passes back and forth twice between Walker County and Catoosa County, before meeting its northern terminus at the Tennessee state line in Rossville.

The following portions of US 27/SR 1 in Georgia are part of the National Highway System, a system of routes determined to be the most important for the nation's economy, mobility, and defense:
From the southern terminus at the Florida state line to the southern terminus of US 27 Bus./SR 1 Bus., southeast of Attapulgus
From the northern terminus of US 27 Bus./SR 1 Bus., north-northwest of Attapulgus, to the southern terminus of US 27 Bus./SR 1 Bus. in Blakely
From the northern terminus of US 27 Bus./SR 1 Bus., in Blakely, to the interchange with US 80/SR 22/SR 540 eastbound in Columbus, which is also the eastern terminus of Double Churches Road
From I-185 southeast of LaGrange to the southern terminus of US 27 Bus./SR 1 Bus. in Bremen
From the northern terminus of US 27 Bus./SR 1 Bus., north-northwest of Bremen, to the southern terminus of US 27 Bus./SR 1 Bus., southeast of Buchanan
From the northern terminus of US 27 Bus./SR 1 Bus., north of Buchanan, to the northern terminus at the Tennessee state line.

History

1920s to 1950s
SR 1 was established at least as early as 1919, traveling on mostly the same path as it does today, with the following differences: the southern terminus at the Florida state line was southeast of Bainbridge; it traveled through Brinson and then northward to Colquitt; from Colquitt, it traveled through Edison, and into Cuthbert; and from LaFayette, it traveled northwest to Trenton, then northeast to the Tennessee state line. By the end of 1921, the southern terminus was shifted west to a point south-southeast of Bainbridge. It was shifted E out of Brinson to a direct path from Bainbridge to Colquitt. The Colquitt–Cuthbert segment was shifted westward to travel through Blakely. At this time, the northern terminus was truncated to LaFayette. SR 53 was proposed just east of LaFayette, and an unnumbered road was built north-northwest to Fort Oglegthorpe and then north to Tennessee. By the end of 1930, US 41W was designated on SR 1 from Rome to LaFayette and possibly on the LaFayette–Tennessee segment of the unnumbered road. By the end of 1931, US 280 was designated on the Cusseta–Columbus segment. By the end of 1934, US 41W was decommissioned, and US 27 was designated on the entire length of SR 1. By the end of 1939, the entire length of US 27/SR 1 from Florida to just south of the Clay–Randolph county line was completed. Between the beginning of 1945 and November 1946, SR 1's path south-southwest of Rome was shifted eastward. Its former path on US 27 was redesignated as SR 1 Spur. Between the beginning of 1940 and the beginning of 1954, US 27/SR 1's path north of Trion was proposed to be shifted to a more eastern alignment. Between June 1954 and June 1955, SR 1's path south-southwest of Rome was reverted to its original path, replacing SR 1 Spur. Its former path was redesignated as SR 1E. Between the beginning of 1953 and the beginning of 1960, SR 1 was rerouted on a more direct path between Amsterdam and Attapulgus. This new path had a "soil surface".

1960s
Between July 1957 and June 1960, SR 1 was proposed to be rerouted on an eastern bypass of Summerville, from a point east-southeast of the city to Trion. Between 1957 and 1962, a southwestern bypass of the main part of Carrollton was proposed from US 27/SR 1 in the southern part of the city to US 27/SR 1/SR 166 in the west-central part. Between 1953 and  1964, the northern terminus of SR 1 Spur was truncated to its original northern terminus, an intersection with US 27/US 280/SR 1 north of Fort Benning. The former path of SR 1 Spur north of US 27/US 280/SR 1 on Fort Benning Road was redesignated as SR 357. Its path on Cusseta Road and Brown Avenue was redesignated as SR 103 Spur. US 280's path through Columbus was shifted onto SR 1 Spur. A freeway in the eastern part of Columbus was under construction from US 27/US 280/SR 1 southeast of Columbus to SR 357 (Buena Vista Road) in the eastern part of the city. It was proposed to be designated from that point to US 27/SR 1 south-southwest of Nankipooh. Between 1954 and 1965, SR 48 was extended eastward on US 27 to the southern terminus of SR 1's proposed eastern bypass of Summerville. SR 114 was extended north-northeast on US 27 to the northern terminus of this bypass. Between 1960 and 1965, US 27 (and possibly SR 1) in the Bainbridge area was shifted onto a freeway-grade bypass of the main part of the city, designated as SR 38 Loop. Its former path was redesignated as US 27 Bus. (and possibly SR 1 Bus.). Between June 1963 and the end of 1965, SR 1 was proposed to be rerouted on a southwestern bypass of Cusseta, from south of the city to west of it. Between 1962 and 1967, SR 1 (and possibly US 27) was shifted onto the bypass of Carrollton. In 1966, the freeway in Columbus was proposed to be part of an eastward rerouting of SR 1. Its former path through Columbus was redesignated as SR 1 Bus. SR 1 was proposed to be designated on an under-construction bypass south of the main part of Rome, from US 27/US 411/SR 53 north-northeast of Six Mile to US 411/SR 101/SR 344 south-southeast of Rome. The northern terminus of SR 1's proposed Summerville bypass was shifted to a point east-northeast of Trion. The next year, 1967, the SR 1 freeway was under construction from SR 357 north to US 27/SR 1. US 80 in Columbus was shifted southeastward, onto US 27/SR 1, then on US 280 and the newer SR 1 Spur. In 1968, US 27/US 411/SR 1 was shifted onto SR 1's southern bypass of Rome. Between 1964 and 1970, the SR 1 freeway was completed to Airport Thruway in the northern part of Columbus.

1970s and 1980s
In 1971, SR 1's path in LaGrange was shifted westward, replacing SR 1 Spur. The next year, 1972, US 27/SR 1, as well as SR 55, was shifted onto the southwestern bypass of Cusseta. In 1975, the SR 1 freeway in Columbus was redesignated as I-185 (with the unsigned SR 411 designation). SR 1 was shifted onto its former path through the city, replacing all of SR 1 Bus. The next year, SR 38 Loop in Bainbridge was decommissioned. SR 38 was designated on SR 38 Loop's former path. SR 38 through the city was redesignated as SR 38 Bus. In 1977, the Summerville bypass of SR 1 was cancelled, with SR 48 and SR 114 reverted to their previous alignments. Five years later, in 1982, an eastern bypass of LaFayette, designated as SR 730, was proposed from southeast of the city to north-northeast of it. In 1987, an eastern bypass of Cedartown, designated as SR 744, was proposed from south-southwest of the city to north-northeast of it. The next year, SR 55 and the newer SR 1 Spur were redesignated as part of SR 520. US 80 in Columbus was shifted north, off of US 280/SR 520. A western bypass of Bremen, designated as SR 793, was proposed from south-southwest of the city to north-northwest of it. US 27/SR 1 in the LaFayette area was shifted eastward, onto the path of SR 730. Its former path was redesignated as US 27 Bus./SR 1 Bus. In 1989, an eastern bypass of Attapulgus, designated as SR 831, was proposed from east-southeast of the city, to north-northwest of it. SR 811 was proposed from US 27/SR 1 south-southeast of Buchanan north-northwest across it and curved around the eastern side of the city to a point north-northwest of it.

1990s and 2000s
In 1991, US 27/SR 1 in the Cedartown area was shifted eastward, onto the path of SR 744, with US 278/SR 6, which was also shifted out of the main part of the city. The former path of US 27/SR 1 was redesignated as US 27 Bus./SR 1 Bus. The next year, an eastern bypass of Blakely, designated as SR 838, was proposed from south-southeast of the city to north-northeast of it. US 27/SR 1 was rerouted onto the proposed path of SR 811 and shifted east of Buchanan. The former path of US 27/SR 1 in the Buchanan area was redesignated as US 27 Bus./SR 1 Bus. The southern half of SR 793 in the Bremen area was built from US 27/SR 1 just north of I-20 to US 78/SR 8 in the city. In 1993, US 27/SR 1 in the Blakely area was shifted eastward, onto the path of SR 838. Its former path was redesignated as US 27 Bus./SR 1 Bus. A southeastern bypass of Cuthbert, designated SR 847, was proposed from south-southwest of the city to north-northeast of it. US 27/SR 1 in the Bremen area was shifted westward, onto the path of SR 793. Its former path was redesignated as US 27 Bus./SR 1 Bus. In 1994, US 27/SR 1 in the Cuthbert area was shifted eastward, onto the path of SR 847. Its former path was redesignated as US 27 Bus./SR 1 Bus. That same year, a western bypass of the Chickamauga and Chattanooga National Military Park, designated SR 813, was proposed from US 27/SR 1 east-northeast of Chickamauga to SR 2 west-southwest of Fort Oglethorpe. The next year, US 27/SR 1 was shifted onto the path of SR 831. Its former path was redesignated as SR 1 Bus. In 2001, US 27/SR 1's path through the Chickamauga and Chattanooga National Military Park was shifted westward, onto the path of SR 813.

Designations
In 1935, the General Assembly of the State of Georgia designated the portion of US 27/SR 1 from Columbus to its northern terminus as "Tennessee-Columbus Military Highway".

In 1941, the General Assembly of the State of Georgia designated the portion of US 27/SR 1 from its southern terminus to Colquitt as "De Soto Trail Highway".

In 1952, the General Assembly of the State of Georgia designated the entirety of US 27 Bus/SR 1 as "Martha Berry Highway", honoring a pioneer in education.

In 1992, the General Assembly of the State of Georgia designated the portion of US 27 Bus/SR 1 from the Chattahoochee-Muscogee county line to its intersection with I-185 as "Robert B. Nett Medal of Honor Highway", honoring a hero of World War II.

In 1993, the General Assembly of the State of Georgia designated the US 27 Bus/SR 1 Bus bypass through Cedartown as "Syble W. Brannan Parkway", honoring a prominent Cedartown resident.

In 1994, the General Assembly of the State of Georgia designated the portion of the US 27 Bus/SR 1 between Summerville and Trion in Chattooga County as "Ralph 'Country' Brown Highway Designation", honoring a prominent Chattooga resident and baseball player.

In 2000, the General Assembly of the State of Georgia designated the US 27 Bus/SR 1 Bus bypass through Cuthbert as "Gerald Green Bypass", honoring a prominent resident of Georgia and member of the Georgia Legislature.

In 2011, the General Assembly of the State of Georgia designated the entirety of US 27 Bus/SR 1 as "Scenic Hometown Highway", for 'tourism enhancement purposes'.  Also in 2011, with the same designation, the portion of US 27/SR 1 between Shields Crossing (near Chickamauga) was designated as "Roy Parrish Parkway", honoring a prominent resident of Walker County.

Major intersections

See also
 
 
 Special routes of U.S. Route 27

References

External links

27
 Georgia
Transportation in Decatur County, Georgia
Transportation in Miller County, Georgia
Transportation in Early County, Georgia
Transportation in Clay County, Georgia
Transportation in Randolph County, Georgia
Transportation in Stewart County, Georgia
Transportation in Chattahoochee County, Georgia
Transportation in Muscogee County, Georgia
Transportation in Harris County, Georgia
Transportation in Troup County, Georgia
Transportation in Heard County, Georgia
Transportation in Carroll County, Georgia
Transportation in Haralson County, Georgia
Transportation in Polk County, Georgia
Transportation in Floyd County, Georgia
Transportation in Chattooga County, Georgia
Transportation in Walker County, Georgia
Transportation in Catoosa County, Georgia
Transportation in Columbus, Georgia